Events from the year 1750 in Canada.

Incumbents
French Monarch: Louis XV
British and Irish Monarch: George II

Governors
Governor General of New France: Jacques-Pierre de Taffanel de la Jonquière, Marquis de la Jonquière
Colonial Governor of Louisiana: Pierre de Rigaud, Marquis de Vaudreuil-Cavagnial
Governor of Nova Scotia: Edward Cornwallis
Commodore-Governor of Newfoundland: Francis William Drake

Events
 1750s: Hudson's Bay Company Saskatchewan River region, reached by trade drummers sent out with goods to tempt the Indians to York.
 c. 1750: The Ojibwa begin to emerge as a distinct tribal amalgamation of smaller independent bands.
 German immigrants begin to arrive in numbers at Halifax.
 Hidatsa villages, site of ancient trading fair, now with both French and Hudson's Bay representatives present each summer.

Births
 James Glenie, army officer, military engineer, businessman, office holder, and politician (d.1817) 
 Simon McTavish, fur trader and dealer in furs, militia officer, office holder, landowner, seigneur, and businessman (d.1804)

Deaths
 October 14: Richard Philipps, military officer, governor of Nova Scotia (b.1661)

Historical documents
British ambassador complains to French about forts built on Isthmus of Chignecto by de la Jonquière (hostilities ensue)
Map: Fort Beauséjour on Isthmus of Chignecto
Edward Cornwallis reports that French intend to secure Chignecto with fortification and oath of allegiance (Note: "savages" used)
Cornwallis reports that Canadians threaten Acadians "with a general massacre[...]if they remain in the province" (Note: "savages" used)
Cornwallis advises Minas Basin Acadians they are deceived by Canadians "to lead you to your ruin" (Note: "savages" used)
British captain reports on naval engagement with French ships carrying arms and provisions to Indigenous people along Bay of Fundy
British ambassador says French unjustifiably occupy land from Chignecto to Saint John River before bilateral commission settles boundary
Letter from Father Le Loutre about movement of families to western Acadia and impatient wait for boundary decision (Note: "savages" used)
French answer British allegations by saying they seek good relations but intend to defend their land against British aggression
Though at same latitude, Nova Scotia not "so agreeable" as southern France because of cold and fog, which forest-clearing would remedy
Many in Halifax died of cold in winter of 1750 for lack of houses, and snow lying about tents "was enough to move the Heart of Stone"
Pehr Kalm's visit to Niagara Falls facilitated by French at Fort Niagara after he shows with passports that he is not a British officer
Reports say Detroit has hundreds living on 30-40 farms "in a fine champaign country," and villages of Wendat, Potawatomi and Odawa
To find Northwest Passage, sail east from Asia to "where it is probable the Weather is milder, and the Seas clearer of Ice"

References 

 
Canada
50